Airlines have proliferated in Africa because, in many countries, road and rail networks are not well developed due to financial issues, terrain, and rainy seasons. Ben R. Guttery, author of Encyclopedia of African Airlines, said "Although most of the carriers have never been large by European or American standards, they have had tremendous impact on the economy and the people." Many larger African airlines are owned partially or completely by national governments. Some African airlines have or formerly had European airlines as major shareholders, such as KLM that has a 7.8% stake in Kenya Airways and British Airways which formerly had an 18% stake in Comair.

History

Historically, the British authorities established locally based airlines, while the national airlines of Belgium, France, Portugal, and Spain served their respective colonies. After African countries became independent, national governments established their own airlines. Many newly independent countries desired to have their own flag carriers to showcase their independence, and those countries wanted large jets like DC-10s and 747s even if the air demand did not warrant those jets. Some airlines, like Air Afrique, were jointly sponsored by multiple governments. Some joint carriers, such as Central African Airways, East African Airways, and West African Airways, were established when the United Kingdom colonized parts of Africa. The knowledge of aircraft, the airline industry, and financial capital, originating from the Europeans, was used to establish the new African carriers.

Government ownership
In many cases European airlines have had colonial influences on African airlines, so issues arose after colonial administrators left Africa and Africans began operating the carriers. Many government airlines are manned by governmental appointees as many airlines form part of the structures of their respective national governments. According to Guttery, therefore, many African airlines are not well managed. This led to airlines being operated at severe losses and/or liquidating.

In addition, profits often go into the general operating funds of their respective countries, while many governments provide insufficient capital for their airlines. Also, many governments make airlines centres for employment and overstaff their airlines, making them inefficient. Guttery said that even though the varieties of government management and ownership of African airlines "may be considered a hindrance in a world market driven by economics," due to the difficulties in raising financial capital and a lack of government infrastructure, government participation is crucial in the formation of airlines. African airlines rely on profitable international routes to subsidize less profitable domestic routes, many of which service very small communities.

Fleet

Compared to aircraft in other world regions, aircraft in Africa tend to be older. As of 2010, 4.3% of all aircraft in the world fly within Africa. Of older aircraft, 12% fly within Africa. While older aircraft have low prices, they have higher fuel consumption rates and maintenance costs than newer aircraft. Because many African airlines have low credit ratings, Africa has a low level of leasing contracts. 5% of leased aircraft in the world fly in Africa.

Alliance participation

The airline alliances within Africa tend to include codeshare agreements between multiple airlines in one consortium, and one African carrier owning equity in another African carrier. Relatively few African airlines participate in alliances with non-African carriers, because not enough of them are able to attract capital investment, and therefore are unable to develop networks attractive to airline alliances. However, a number of African flag carriers have been able to join global airline alliance networks: South African Airways became a member of Star Alliance on 10 April 2006. Kenya Airways became an associate member of SkyTeam on 4 September 2007, and it became a full SkyTeam member in 2010. Egyptair became a member of Star Alliance in July 2008, as did Ethiopian Airlines in December 2011. Royal Air Maroc  joined Oneworld on 1 April 2020.

Safety

As of 1998, the International Civil Aviation Organization ranked Africa and Latin America as the world regions with the least safe air transportation networks. The African civil aviation network has undercapitalized infrastructure. As of 1998, Africa's air traffic control systems were not as developed as ATC systems in other parts of the world; Ben R. Guttery says that the lack of air traffic in Africa compensates for the underdeveloped ATC system. Also, compared to larger airfields, smaller airfields are less likely to have hard-surfaced runways. Guttery said in 1998 that major African airports "are virtually indistinguishable from those in developed countries." He also said in 1998 that "Airport security issues continue to be a problem, but they are being addressed."

By 2005, about 25% of aircraft crashes in the world occurred in Africa, while African flights are 5% of worldwide airline traffic. The Wall Street Journal stated that "For decades, African aviation has suffered from antiquated planes, crumbling airports, broken equipment and poorly trained pilots" and that Africa had a "widespread neglect that makes this continent's skies the most dangerous in the world." The WSJ stated that a lack of enforcement of minimal safety standards by governments due to a lack of power or dishonesty is "the broadest reason for the dismal safety record".

By 2020 however, African aviation had improved safety to the point that flying in Africa is safer than the global average with respect to accidents per million flights.

See also

 List of airlines of Africa
List of largest airlines in Africa
 African Airlines Association

References

External links 

 "Independence in the Air: African Aviation in the 1960s." Digital Exhibit. Northwestern University Transportation Library. 2018.